In Roman mythology, Natio (Latin: "birth", "nation") was one of many goddesses of birth, and a protector of women in labor. According to Cicero in De Natura Deorum (On the Nature of the Gods), she was worshipped particularly in the territory of Ardea.

See also
 List of Roman birth and childhood deities
 Di nixi

References

Personifications in Roman mythology
Roman goddesses
Childhood goddesses